Moubray Glacier is a rather steep glacier flowing south to Moubray Bay from Adare Saddle on Adare Peninsula in Antarctica. It is one of the main contributors of ice to Moubray Piedmont Glacier. The glacier was named by the New Zealand Geological Survey Antarctic Expedition of 1957–58 for its proximity to Moubray Bay.

References

Glaciers of Victoria Land
Borchgrevink Coast